My Man Godfrey is a 1936 American screwball comedy film directed by Gregory La Cava and starring William Powell and Carole Lombard, who had been briefly married years before appearing together in the film. The screenplay for My Man Godfrey was written by Morrie Ryskind, with uncredited contributions by La Cava, based on 1101 Park Avenue, a short novel by Eric S. Hatch. The story concerns a socialite who hires a derelict to be her family's butler, and then falls in love with him.

In 1999, the original version of My Man Godfrey was deemed "culturally significant" by the United States Library of Congress and selected for preservation in the National Film Registry. The film was remade in 1957 with June Allyson and David Niven in the starring roles.

Plot
During the Great Depression, Godfrey "Smith" Parke is unemployed, living with other homeless men down on their luck at a New York City dump in a Hooverville on the East River near the 59th Street Bridge. One night, a spoiled socialite named Cornelia Bullock offers him $5 to be her "forgotten man" for a scavenger hunt. The annoyed Godfrey refuses, causing Cornelia to retreat and fall on a pile of ashes, much to the glee of her younger sister and rival Irene. After talking with Irene, Godfrey finds her to be kind and offers to go with her to help her beat Cornelia, as well as satisfy his own curiosity regarding their scavenger hunt.

In the ballroom of the Waldorf-Ritz Hotel, Irene's businessman father Alexander Bullock waits resignedly as his wife Angelica and her mooching protégé Carlo play the game. Godfrey arrives and is authenticated as a "forgotten man", allowing Irene to win the game. However, Godfrey takes the opportunity to address his contempt for the audience's antics before leaving in a huff. Realizing what she brought him into, an apologetic Irene offers Godfrey to be her protégé by hiring him as the new family butler, which he gratefully accepts.

On his first day as the new butler, Godfrey is warned by the Bullocks' maid Molly that he is merely the latest in a long line of butlers who didn't last long due to the Bullocks' conflicting personalities and antics. Despite this, Godfrey proves to be surprisingly competent and resourceful in his duties, but Cornelia holds a grudge against him, intending to get him in trouble and have him dumped back into the streets. In the meantime, Irene proves herself to be far kinder and more empathetic than her family, particularly her sister, but just as spoiled and altogether naïve, becoming infatuated with Godfrey through no more than basic interaction and general allure. She even goes as far as to kiss him, causing a job-anxious Godfrey to politely but firmly outline the boundaries of their employee-employer relationship.

Eventually, Godfrey is recognized by his longtime friend Tommy Gray at a tea party thrown by Irene. Godfrey makes up a story that he was Tommy's valet at Harvard, to which Tommy plays along by embellishing Godfrey's story with a nonexistent wife and five children. Upon hearing this, a dismayed Irene impulsively announces her engagement to the surprised Charlie Van Rumple but breaks down in tears and flees after being congratulated by Godfrey. Over lunch the next day, Tommy is curious to know what one of the elite "Parkes of Boston" is doing as a servant. Godfrey explains that a broken love affair left him broke and considering suicide, but the undaunted attitude of the homeless men living at the dump rekindled his spirits.

Eventually, Irene breaks her engagement with Charlie. Cornelia attempts to seduce Godfrey on his day off, but when he rebuffs her, she plants her pearl necklace under Godfrey's mattress and calls the police, intending to have him arrested. However, the police couldn't find the pearls inside the mattress, and Mr. Bullock (having deduced what Cornelia did) furiously informed Cornelia that the pearls are not insured and that she will lose a great deal of money if she doesn't find the necklace, distressing her. The Bullocks send their daughters to Europe to get Irene away from her now-broken engagement, but when they return, Cornelia implies that she intends to seduce Godfrey again. A worried Irene stages a fainting spell and swoons into Godfrey's arms, but he rebuffs her after realizing that she's faking. Having enough of Irene's behavior, Godfrey announces his resignation as the butler.

Before Godfrey is about to leave, Mr. Bullock throws Carlo out (literally), and announces to the family that their business is failing and that he tried to recoup the losses with his stockholders' money behind their backs, which will land him in prison on embezzlement charges and leave the rest of the family penniless. However, Godfrey provides good news: he had sold short, using some of the money raised by pawning Cornelia's pearl necklace to buy up the stock that Bullock had sold. He gives the stock back to Mr. Bullock, saving the family from financial ruin. Godfrey also returns the necklace to Cornelia, who concedes defeat by confessing to planting the necklace in the mattress and humbly expressing her gratitude and remorse for her behavior. As Godfrey leaves, the grateful Molly and the Bullocks are saddened to see him go, but Irene is determined to follow him.

With Godfrey's remaining profits, Godfrey and Tommy become business partners as they convert the now-filled-in dump into a fashionable nightclub called "The Dump", creating new jobs for the other homeless men, with a housing plan for new SRO apartments for them. Upon hearing of Godfrey's new occupation during The Dump's grand opening, a determined Irene finds Godfrey and convinces him to marry her by persuading the Mayor (who is the guest of honor) to perform a civil wedding while her chauffeur serves as a witness.

Cast

 William Powell as Godfrey 
 Carole Lombard as Irene Bullock
 Alice Brady as Angelica Bullock
 Gail Patrick as Cornelia Bullock
 Jean Dixon as Molly
 Eugene Pallette as Alexander Bullock
 Alan Mowbray as Tommy Gray
 Mischa Auer as Carlo
 Pat Flaherty as Mike Flaherty
 Robert Light as Faithful George
 Fred Coby as Investigator (uncredited)
 Grady Sutton as Charlie Van Rumple (uncredited)
 Franklin Pangborn as Scavenger Hunt Judge (uncredited)
 Bess Flowers as Mrs. Merriweather (uncredited)
 Grace Field as a socialite (uncredited)
 Jane Wyman as a socialite (uncredited)

Production
The film was based on a 1935 novel by Eric S. Hatch. Charles Rogers, head of Universal, called it "a sure-fire laugh-getting novel". That studio purchased the film rights and assigned Hatch to write the script with Morrie Ryskind, who received top billing for the screenplay. Rogers hired Gregory La Cava to direct, "the best comedy director in Hollywood."

Casting
It was the first major film from Universal after that studio had been taken over by new management, including head of production Charles Rogers. However the studio did not have any major stars under contract apart from Buck Jones, Boris Karloff and Edward Everett Horton, and needed to borrow some from other studios.

The studio's original choice to play Irene, the part eventually played by Carole Lombard, was Constance Bennett, and Miriam Hopkins also was considered, but the director Gregory La Cava would only agree to Bennett if Universal borrowed William Powell from MGM. Powell, for his part, only would take the role if Carole Lombard played Irene. Powell and Lombard had divorced three years earlier.

Powell's casting was announced in January 1936. Universal borrowed Lombard from Paramount. As part of the deal, Universal loaned Paramount Margaret Sullavan for the film I Love a Soldier and Lombard's clothes designer, Travis Banton, accompanied her. Alice Brady joined the cast in March.

Shooting
My Man Godfrey was in production from April 15 to May 27, 1936, and then had retakes in early June of the year. Its budget was $575,375; Powell was paid $87,500 and Lombard $45,645. The film was one of the first under the new regime of Charles Rogers at Universal, although it had been developed under his predecessor Carl Laemmle Jr.

La Cava, a former animator and freelancer for most of his film career, held studio executives in contempt and was known to be a bit eccentric. When he and Powell hit a snag over a disagreement about how Godfrey should be portrayed, they settled things over a bottle of Scotch. The next morning, La Cava showed up for shooting with a headache, but Powell didn't appear. Instead, the actor sent a telegram stating: "WE MAY HAVE FOUND GODFREY LAST NIGHT BUT WE LOST POWELL. SEE YOU TOMORROW."

Due to insurance considerations a stand-in stuntman (Chick Collins) was used when Godfrey carried Irene over his shoulder up the stairs to her bedroom.

When tensions hit a high point on the set, Lombard had a habit of inserting four-letter words into her dialogue, often to the great amusement of the cast. This made shooting somewhat difficult, but clips of her cursing in her dialogue and messing up her lines can still be seen in blooper reels.

Release and reception
It was the first film released under the aegis of Charles Rogers and was given a big premiere. My Man Godfrey premiered on September 6, 1936, and was released in the United States on the 17th of September. It was a runaway hit and earned huge profits for the studio.

The movie was one of the most acclaimed comedies of 1936. Writing for The Spectator in 1936, Graham Greene gave the film a moderately positive review, characterizing it as "acutely funny [for three-quarters of its way]". Particularly praising the scene of the scavenging party, Greene finds it to be "perhaps the wittiest, as well as noisiest, sequence of the year". Considering the end of the film, however, he notes that "the social conscience is a little confused" and he wishes for a more "dignified exit".

Awards and honors 

My Man Godfrey was the first movie to be nominated in all four acting categories, in the first year that supporting categories were introduced. It is also the only film in Oscar history to receive a nomination in all four acting categories and not be nominated for Best Picture. It was the only film to be nominated in these six categories and not receive any award until 2013's American Hustle.

In 1999, the film was deemed "culturally significant" by the United States Library of Congress and selected for preservation in the National Film Registry. In 2000, the film was ranked #44 on the American Film Institute's list of the 100 funniest comedies, and Premiere voted it one of "The 50 Greatest Comedies Of All Time" in 2006. Rotten Tomatoes gives it a score of 100% with an average rating of 8.3/10 with the consensus stating: "A class satire in a class of its own, My Man Godfrey's screwball comedy is as sharp as the social commentary is biting."

Public domain status
The original film is generally thought to have lapsed into the public domain due to a failure to renew the film's copyright after 28 years. However the underlying work, the 1935 book 1101 Park Avenue – re-titled My Man Godfrey with the film's release – had its copyright renewed in 1963 and is thus still in copyright. According to Stanford University Library, and under rulings of Stewart v. Abend, in so-called multilayered works, the rights holder of the original work can claim ownership of the film script, though not the pictures, if the original book is still in copyright. "Films are often based on books ... that may maintain copyright. If the pre-existing work is protected, then rightly or wrongly, it has generally been determined that the derived film is also protected."

Home media 
In 2002, a restored print was made available on DVD by The Criterion Collection, which featured a new cover art illustrated by Michael Koelsch. In 2005, 20th Century Fox Home Video released a colorized version.

Remakes and adaptations
My Man Godfrey was twice adapted as a one-hour radio broadcast on Lux Radio Theatre: on May 9, 1938, with David Niven playing the part of Tommy Gray; and on November 9, 1954, with Jeff Chandler and Julie Adams. It was also adapted to radio in a half-hour version on the October 2, 1946 episode of Academy Award Theater, again starring William Powell. When the film was remade in 1957, David Niven played Godfrey opposite June Allyson, directed by Henry Koster. A stage musical version of My Man Godfrey, produced by Allan Carr and written by librettists Alan Jay Lerner and Kristi Kane and composer Gerard Kenny, was intended for Broadway in 1985, but remained uncompleted at the time of Alan Jay Lerner's death in 1986.

See also
 Public domain film
 List of American films of 1936
 List of films in the public domain in the United States

References

External links

 
 
 
 
 
 
 

 Streaming audio
 My Man Godfrey on Lux Radio Theater: May 9, 1938
 My Man Godfrey on Academy Award Theater: October 2, 1946
  My Man Godfrey on Theater of Romance: July 11, 1944
 My Man Godfrey on Theater of Romance: July 21, 1947

1936 films
1936 romantic comedy films
1930s screwball comedy films
American black-and-white films
American romantic comedy films
American screwball comedy films
Articles containing video clips
1930s English-language films
Films about dysfunctional families
Films about social class
Films based on American novels
Films based on romance novels
Films directed by Gregory La Cava
Films set in country houses
Films set in Manhattan
United States National Film Registry films
Universal Pictures films
1930s American films